Jassim Mohammed Buallay (born March 15, 1942) is a retired Bahraini Ambassador.

Career
From 1963 to 1969 he was Supervisor of Bursary Section of the Ministry of Education.
From 1970 to 1974 he was international civil servant at the UNESCO in Paris, 
From 1974 to 1979 he was ambassador in Paris.
From 1979 to 1987 he was Director of Economic Affairs in the Ministry of Foreign Affairs (Bahrain). 
From 1987 to  he was Ambassador in Tunis (Tunisia).
From  to  he was Permanent Representative next the Headquarters of the United Nations.
In December 1998 he was President of the United Nations Security Council.

References

1942 births
Living people
Ambassadors of Bahrain to France
Ambassadors of Bahrain to Tunisia
Permanent Representatives of Bahrain to the United Nations